Antaeotricha compsoneura is a moth of the family Depressariidae. It is found in Brazil (Para) and French Guiana.

The wingspan is 16–17 mm. The forewings are whitish-ochreous, all veins marked with pale brownish lines. The second discal stigma is blackish and there is a marginal series of blackish dots around the apex and termen. The hindwings are whitish-grey.

References

Moths described in 1925
compsoneura
Taxa named by Edward Meyrick
Moths of South America